John Jacob Brenholt, Sr. (October 14, 1843–May 20, 1934) was an American lawyer and politician.

Brenholt was born in St. Louis, Missouri. He went to Illinois College and to Albany Law School. He was admitted to the Illinois bar and practiced law in Chicago, Illinois for one year. He then moved to Alton, Illinois and continued to practice law. He served on the Alton City Council. Brenholt then served as mayor of Alton from 1893 to 1895. He was a Republican. Brenholt served in the Illinois Senate from 1899 to 1903 and served as president of the Illinois Senate. Brenholt died at his home in Alton, Illinois.

Notes

External links

1843 births
1934 deaths
Illinois College alumni
Albany Law School alumni
Lawyers from Chicago
Lawyers from St. Louis
Politicians from St. Louis
People from Alton, Illinois
Illinois city council members
Mayors of places in Illinois
Illinois state senators